Morro (Spanish and Portuguese for "hill") may refer to:

Buildings
El Morro mine, Atacama, Chile
El Morro National Monument, New Mexico
Morro del Tulcán, pyramid in Popayán, Cauca
Morro Castle (Havana), fortress in Havana, Cuba
El Morro de San Felipe, fortress in Puerto Plata, Dominican Republic
Castillo San Felipe del Morro, a citadel in San Juan, Puerto Rico

Geology
Morro Rock, a volcanic plug located just offshore from Morro Bay, California
Isla El Morro, island near Acapulco, Mexico
Isla El Morro, small island near Taboga Island, Panama

Places
Brazil
 Morro Agudo, a municipality in the state of São Paulo
 Morro Agudo de Goiás, a municipality in the state of Goiás
 Morro Cabeça no Tempo, a municipality in the state of Piauí
 Morro da Fumaça, a municipality in the state of Santa Catarina
 Morro do Chapéu, a municipality in the state of Bahia
 Morro do Chapéu do Piauí, a municipality in the state of Piauí
 Morro da Garça, a municipality in the state of Minas Gerais
 Morro do Pilar, a municipality in the state of Minas Gerais
 Morro Grande, a municipality in the state of Santa Catarina
 Morro Redondo, a municipality in the state of Rio Grande do Sul
 Morro Reuter, a municipality in the state of Rio Grande do Sul
 Mulungu do Morro, a municipality in the state of Bahia
 Morro da Providência, a favela in Rio de Janeiro

Cape Verde
Morro, Cape Verde, a village in the island of Maio

Italy
Morro (Camerino), a civil parish of Camerino (MC), Marche
Morro (Foligno), a civil parish of Foligno (PG), Umbria
Morro d'Alba, a municipality in the Province of Ancona, Marche
Morro d'Oro, a municipality in the Province of Teramo, Abruzzo
Morro Reatino, a municipality in the Province of Rieti, Lazio

United States
Morro Bay, California, a town in San Luis Obispo County, California
El Morro, New Mexico, an unincorporated community in Cibola County, New Mexico

Other
Morro (plant)
Microsoft Security Essentials, codenamed Morro
Morro, a character in Lego Ninjago

See also
Morra (disambiguation)
Moro (disambiguation)
Morro Castle (disambiguation)